24 Hours of a Woman's Life, also known as Affair in Monte Carlo, is a 1952 British romantic drama film directed by Victor Saville and starring Merle Oberon, Richard Todd and Leo Genn. It is loosely based on the novella by Stefan Zweig. Produced by ABPC, it was shot at the company's Elstree Studios and on location in Monaco. The film's sets were designed by the art director Terence Verity.

Plot
Monsieur Blanc, the middle-aged proprietor of a café in Antibes, is eagerly preparing for his wedding to Henriette. He is devastated, however, when Henriette runs away with a young man she apparently only met the day before. Robert Sterling, a writer and one of the café patrons, tells the other diners that he has seen the same thing before: someone falling in love with a complete stranger.

He was playing host to Linda, a young widow whom he knew well, and three other guests aboard his yacht anchored in Monte Carlo. When he persuades her to visit the casino one night, she became irresistibly attracted to an unstable young man who became suicidal after losing all his money at roulette. Sterling describes how they fell deeply in love, and how they then had to face difficult decisions about the future.

Cast

 Merle Oberon as Linda
 Richard Todd as A Young Man
 Leo Genn as Robert Stirling
 Stephen Murray as L'Abbé Benoit
 Peter Reynolds as Peter
 Joan Dowling as Mrs. Barry
 June Clyde as 	Mrs. Roche
 Peter Illing as Monsieur Blanc
Jacques B. Brunius as 	Concierge, Pension Lisa
 Isabel Dean as Miss Johnson
 Peter Jones as	Bill
 Yvonne Furneaux as Henriette
 Mara Lane as Alice Brown
 Robert Ayres as Frank Brown
 Cyril Smith as	Harry
 Mark Baker as 	Mr. Rohe
 Moultrie Kelsall as 	Murdoch
 Trader Faulkner as Mr. Barry
 Jeanne Pali as Mme Blanc
 Rene Poirier as Attendant, Hotel Royalo
 Marguerite D'Alvarez as Mme Benoit
 Virginia Bedard as 	Lady in Cook's Office
 Gordon Bell as 	Clerk in Cook's Office
 Jill Clifford as Estelle Hunter
 Peter Hobbes as 	David Hunter

Critical reception
The Spectator described it as "a film of such artificiality and bathos the very typewriter keys cling together to avoid describing it." TV Guide called the film a "poor sudser, although the background of the romantic Riviera and its fabulous casino provides some exotic interest."

References

External links

1952 films
British romantic drama films
British remakes of German films
Films based on works by Stefan Zweig
Films directed by Victor Saville
Films set in Monaco
Films shot in Monaco
Films shot at Associated British Studios
Films set on the French Riviera
Films about roulette
1952 romantic drama films
1950s English-language films
1950s British films